Stefan Šormaz (born 10 August 1999) is a Serbian footballer.

Club career

Spartak Subotica
Šormaz joined Spartak Subotica at the age of 5 and passed the whole club's youth categories as the best team scorer. In October 2017, he signed his first professional contract with the club, until 15 January 2021, after which he promoted as the first team member with number 19 jersey. After the match against Rad he missed as an unused substitution on the bench, Šormaz made his senior debut against Red Star Belgrade at the Rajko Mitić Stadium, replacing Bojan Čečarić in 87 minute of the postponed 9 fixture SuperLiga match played on 25 October 2016.

Career statistics

Club

References

External links
 
 
 

1999 births
Living people
Sportspeople from Subotica
Association football forwards
Serbian footballers
FK Spartak Subotica players
FK Bačka 1901 players
Serbian SuperLiga players